The salt marsh common yellowthroat, (Geothlypis trichas sinuosa), is a subspecies of the common yellowthroat, a New World warbler.

The salt marsh common yellowthroat has experienced a dramatic 80% decline from the early 20th century through 1976. It is a species of concern for protection in efforts to restore Chelsea Wetlands in Hercules, California.

References

Parulidae
Birds of North America